The Big Bend Rancheria is a settlement of the Pit River Tribe (Achomawi) north of Big Bend, in Shasta County, California.

Education
The ranchería is served by the Indian Springs Elementary School District and Shasta Union High School District.

References

See also
 List of Indian reservations in the United States

Pit River tribes
Geography of Shasta County, California
American Indian reservations in California